Conus rosi is a species of sea snail, a marine gastropod mollusc in the family Conidae, the cone snails, cone shells or cones.

These snails are predatory and venomous. They are capable of "stinging" humans.

Description
The length of the shell varies between 13 mm and 23 mm.

Distribution
This marine species occurs in the Caribbean Sea off Aruba

References

 Petuch E.J. & Berschauer D.P. (2015). Two new species of Tenorioconus (Gastropoda: Conidae) from Aruba. The Festivus. 47(3): 195-205. page(s): 197, figs 1, 3A, B, C, 6C, 7

External links
 

rosi
Gastropods described in 2015